Ramhormoz County (Lurish: رۉمەز Rümez) is in Khuzestan province, Iran. The capital of the county is the city of Ramhormoz. At the 2006 census, the county's population was 120,194 in 25.359 households. The following census in 2011 counted 105,418 people in 25,313 households, by which time Haftkel District had been separated from the county to form Haftkel County. At the 2016 census, Ramhormoz County's population was 113,776 in 30,591 households.

Administrative divisions

The population history and structural changes of Ramhormoz County's administrative divisions over three consecutive censuses are shown in the following table. The latest census shows four districts, eight rural districts, and one city.

References

 

Counties of Khuzestan Province